A biosafety level (BSL), or pathogen/protection level, is a set of biocontainment precautions required to isolate dangerous biological agents in an enclosed laboratory facility. The levels of containment range from the lowest biosafety level 1 (BSL-1) to the highest at level 4 (BSL-4). In the United States, the Centers for Disease Control and Prevention (CDC) have specified these levels. In the European Union, the same biosafety levels are defined in a directive. In Canada the four levels are known as Containment Levels. Facilities with these designations are also sometimes given as P1 through P4 (for pathogen or protection level), as in the term P3 laboratory.

At the lowest level of biosafety, precautions may consist of regular hand-washing and minimal protective equipment. At higher biosafety levels, precautions may include airflow systems, multiple containment rooms, sealed containers, positive pressure personnel suits, established protocols for all procedures, extensive personnel training, and high levels of security to control access to the facility. Health Canada reports that world-wide until 1999 there were recorded over 5,000 cases of accidental laboratory infections and 190 deaths.

History 
The first prototype Class III (maximum containment) biosafety cabinet was fashioned in 1943 by Hubert Kaempf Jr., then a U.S. Army soldier, under the direction of Arnold G. Wedum, Director (1944–69) of Industrial Health and Safety at the United States Army Biological Warfare Laboratories, Camp Detrick, Maryland. Kaempf was tired of his MP duties at Detrick and was able to transfer to the sheet metal department working with the contractor, the H.K. Ferguson Co.

On 18 April 1955, fourteen representatives met at Camp Detrick in Frederick, Maryland. The meeting was to share knowledge and experiences regarding biosafety, chemical, radiological, and industrial safety issues that were common to the operations at the three principal biological warfare (BW) laboratories of the U.S. Army. Because of the potential implication of the work conducted at biological warfare laboratories, the conferences were restricted to top level security clearances. Beginning in 1957, these conferences were planned to include non-classified sessions as well as classified sessions to enable broader sharing of biological safety information. It was not until 1964, however, that conferences were held in a government installation not associated with a biological warfare program.

Over the next ten years, the biological safety conferences grew to include representatives from all federal agencies that sponsored or conducted research with pathogenic microorganisms. By 1966, it began to include representatives from universities, private laboratories, hospitals, and industrial complexes. Throughout the 1970s, participation in the conferences continued to expand and by 1983 discussions began regarding the creation of a formal organization. The American Biological Safety Association (ABSA) was officially established in 1984 and a constitution and bylaws were drafted the same year. As of 2008, ABSA includes some 1,600 members in its professional association.

In 1977, Jim Peacock of the Australian Academy of Science asked Bill Snowdon, then chief of the CSIRO's Australian Animal Health Laboratory (AAHL) if he could have the newly released United States' National Institutes of Health and the British equivalent requirements for the development of infrastructure for bio-containment reviewed by AAHL personnel with a view to recommending the adoption of one of them by Australian authorities. The review was carried out by CSIRO AAHL Project Manager Bill Curnow and CSIRO Engineer Arthur Jenkins. They drafted outcomes for each of the levels of security. AAHL was notionally classified as "substantially beyond P4". These were adopted by the Australian Academy of Science and became the basis for Australian legislation. It opened in 1985 costing $185 million, built on Corio Oval. The Australian Animal Health Laboratory is a Class 4/ P4 Laboratory.

Levels

Biosafety level 1 

Biosafety level 1 (BSL-1) is suitable for work with well-characterized agents which do not cause disease in healthy humans. In general, these agents should pose minimal potential hazard to laboratory personnel and the environment. At this level, precautions are limited relative to other levels. Laboratory personnel must wash their hands upon entering and exiting the lab. Research with these agents may be performed on standard open laboratory benches without the use of special containment equipment. However, eating and drinking are generally prohibited in laboratory areas. Potentially infectious material must be decontaminated before disposal, either by adding a chemical such as bleach or isopropanol or by packaging for decontamination elsewhere. Personal protective equipment is only required for circumstances where personnel might be exposed to hazardous material. BSL-1 laboratories must have a door which can be locked to limit access to the lab.  However, it is not necessary for BSL-1 labs to be isolated from the general building.

This level of biosafety is appropriate for work with several kinds of microorganisms including non-pathogenic strains of Escherichia coli and Staphylococcus, Bacillus subtilis, Saccharomyces cerevisiae and other organisms not suspected to contribute to human disease. Due to the relative ease and safety of maintaining a BSL-1 laboratory, these are the types of laboratories generally used as teaching spaces for high schools and colleges.

Biosafety level 2 

At this level, all precautions used at Biosafety Level 1 are followed, and some additional precautions are taken. BSL-2 differs from BSL-1 in that:
 "laboratory personnel have specific training in handling pathogenic agents and are directed by competent scientists."
 Access to the laboratory is limited when work is being conducted.
 Certain procedures in which infectious aerosols or splashes may be created are conducted in biological safety cabinets or other physical containment equipment.
 Extreme precautions are taken with contaminated sharp items.

Biosafety level 2 is suitable for work involving agents of moderate potential hazard to personnel and the environment. This includes various microbes that cause mild disease to humans, or are difficult to contract via aerosol in a lab setting. Examples of pathogens classified as "Risk Group 2" in the United States include hepatitis A, B, and C viruses, human immunodeficiency virus (HIV), pathogenic strains of Escherichia coli and Staphylococcus, Salmonella, Plasmodium falciparum, and Toxoplasma gondii. Notably, the European Union departs from the United States and classifies HIV and hepatitis B  G as Risk Group 3 agents best handled at BSL-3. 

Prions, the infectious agents that transmit prion diseases such as vCJD, are typically handled under Biosafety Level 2 or higher. This is due to the lack of any evidence of aerosol transmission and relatively higher infective dose of prion diseases, though some circumstances (such as handling animal-infective prions in a facility which cares for vulnerable animals) would require BSL-3 conditions.

Biosafety level 3 

Biosafety level 3 is appropriate for work involving microbes which can cause serious and potentially lethal disease via the inhalation route. This type of work can be done in clinical, diagnostic, teaching, research, or production facilities. Here, the precautions undertaken in BSL-1 and BSL-2 labs are followed, as well as additional measures including:
 A laboratory-specific biosafety manual must be drafted which details how the laboratory will operate in compliance with all safety requirements.
 All laboratory personnel are provided medical surveillance and offered relevant immunizations (where available) to reduce the risk of an accidental or unnoticed infection.
 All procedures involving infectious material must be done within a biological safety cabinet.
 Laboratory personnel must wear solid-front protective clothing (i.e. gowns that tie in the back). This cannot be worn outside of the laboratory and must be discarded or decontaminated after each use.

In addition, the facility which houses the BSL-3 laboratory must have certain features to ensure appropriate containment. The entrance to the laboratory must be separated from areas of the building with unrestricted traffic flow. Additionally, the laboratory must be behind two sets of self-closing doors (to reduce the risk of aerosols escaping). The construction of the laboratory is such that it can be easily cleaned. Carpets are not permitted, and any seams in the floors, walls, and ceilings are sealed to allow for easy cleaning and decontamination. Additionally, windows must be sealed, and a ventilation system installed which forces air to flow from the "clean" areas of the lab to the areas where infectious agents are handled. Air from the laboratory must be filtered before it can be recirculated.

A 2015 study by USA Today journalists identified more than 200 lab sites in the U.S. that were accredited biosafety levels 3 or 4. The Proceedings of a Workshop on "Developing Norms for the Provision of Biological Laboratories in Low-Resource Contexts" provides a list of BSL-3 laboratories in those countries.

Biosafety level 3 is commonly used for research and diagnostic work involving various microbes which can be transmitted by aerosols and/or cause severe disease. These include Francisella tularensis, Mycobacterium tuberculosis, Chlamydia psittaci, Venezuelan equine encephalitis virus, Eastern equine encephalitis virus, SARS-CoV-1, MERS-CoV, Coxiella burnetii, Rift Valley fever virus, Rickettsia rickettsii, several species of Brucella, chikungunya, yellow fever virus, West Nile virus, Yersinia pestis, and SARS-CoV-2.

Biosafety level 4 

Biosafety level 4 (BSL-4) is the highest level of biosafety precautions, and is appropriate for work with agents that could easily be aerosol-transmitted within the laboratory and cause severe to fatal disease in humans for which there are no available vaccines or treatments. BSL-4 laboratories are generally set up to be either cabinet laboratories or protective-suit laboratories. In cabinet laboratories, all work must be done within a class III biosafety cabinet. Materials leaving the cabinet must be decontaminated by passing through an autoclave or a tank of disinfectant. The cabinets themselves are required to have seamless edges to allow for easy cleaning. Additionally, the cabinet and all materials within must be free of sharp edges to reduce the risk of damage to the gloves. In a protective-suit laboratory, all work must be done in a class II biosafety cabinet by personnel wearing a positive pressure suit. To exit the BSL-4 laboratory, personnel must pass through a chemical shower for decontamination, then a room for removing the positive-pressure suit, followed by a personal shower. Entry into the BSL-4 laboratory is restricted to trained and authorized individuals, and all persons entering and exiting the laboratory must be recorded.

As with BSL-3 laboratories, BSL-4 laboratories must be separated from areas that receive unrestricted traffic. Additionally airflow is tightly controlled to ensure that air always flows from "clean" areas of the lab to areas where work with infectious agents is being performed. The entrance to the BSL-4 lab must also employ airlocks to minimize the possibility that aerosols from the lab could be removed from the lab. All laboratory waste, including filtered air, water, and trash must also be decontaminated before it can leave the facility.

Biosafety level 4 laboratories are used for diagnostic work and research on easily transmitted pathogens which can cause fatal disease. These include a number of viruses known to cause viral hemorrhagic fever such as Marburg virus, Ebola virus, Lassa virus, and Crimean-Congo hemorrhagic fever. Other pathogens handled at BSL-4 include Hendra virus, Nipah virus, and some flaviviruses. Additionally, poorly characterized pathogens which appear closely related to dangerous pathogens are often handled at this level until sufficient data are obtained either to confirm continued work at this level, or to permit working with them at a lower level. This level is also used for work with Variola virus, the causative agent of smallpox, though this work is only performed at the Centers for Disease Control and Prevention in Atlanta, United States, and the State Research Center of Virology and Biotechnology in Koltsovo, Russia.

BSL-4 facilities for extraterrestrial samples

Sample-return missions that bring back to Earth samples obtained from a Category V body must be curated at facilities rated BSL-4. Because the existing BSL-4 facilities in the world do not provide the level of cleanliness necessary to such pristine samples, there is a need to design a facility dedicated to curation of restricted (potentially biohazardous) extraterrestrial materials. The systems of such facilities must be able to contain unknown biohazards, as the sizes of any putative alien microorganisms are unknown. Ideally, it should filter particles down to 10 nanometers, and release of a particle 50 nanometers or larger is unacceptable under any circumstance.

Because NASA and ESA are collaborating on the Mars Sample Return campaign, due to return samples from Mars in the early 2030s, the need for a Sample Receiving Facility (SRF) is becoming more pressing. An SRF is expected to take 7 to 10 years from design to completion, and an additional two years is recommended for the staff to become proficient and accustomed to the facilities.

List of BSL-4 facilities 

According to a U.S. Government Accountability Office (GAO) report published on 4 October 2007, a total of 1,356 CDC/USDA registered BSL-3 facilities were identified throughout the United States. Approximately 36% of these laboratories are located in academia. 15 BSL-4 facilities were identified in the U.S. in 2007, including nine at federal labs. As of May 2021, there are 42 BSL-4 facilities in operation around the world, with a further 17 planned or under construction.

The following is a list of existing BSL-4 facilities worldwide.

Safety concerns
A North Carolina Mosquito & Vector Control Association (NCMVCA) study highlighted safety concerns. In the United States, laboratories can be funded by federal, state, private, non-profit, or academically. The last accounts for 72% of the funding.

High-containment labs that are registered with the Centers for Disease Control and Prevention (CDC) and the U.S. Department of Agriculture's (USDA) Select Agent Program must adhere to Department of Defense standards. Since BSL3 and 4 laboratories in the United States are regulated by either the CDC or USDA or another federal agency (depending on the pathogens they handle), no single federal agency is responsible for regulating or tracking the number of these labs. U.S. high-containment laboratories that handle pathogens which are declared as "select agents" must be inspected periodically by the CDC or USDA, adhere to certain standards, and maintain ongoing education on biosecurity and biosafety policies as mandated by law.

See also 
 Aeromedical Isolation Team
 Biocontainment
 Biological hazard
 Biosafety
 Hazmat suit
 Interplanetary contamination
 Laboratory Response Network
 List of laboratory biosecurity incidents
 Safety engineering
 Security engineering
 Select agent

References

External links 
 Biosafety in Microbiological and Biomedical Laboratories, CDC publication
 Federation of American Scientists: Biosafety Level 3 and 4 Labs

Safety
Biological hazards

Biosafety level 3 laboratories